Abdul Karim Koroma (born 25 September 1944) is a former Sierra Leonean politician. Koroma served in the Sierra Leonean government as Minister of Education (1977–1982), Regional Minister of the Northern Province (1982–1985), and foreign minister (1985–1992). From 1998 to 2000, Koroma served on the President's National Policy Advisory Committee during the end of the Sierra Leone Civil War.
He has also been the High Commissioner to Australia.
Author of the following publications: (1) Sierra Leone The Agony of a Nation and (2) Crisis and Intervention in Sierra Leone 1996 to 2003. Andromeda Publications

References

1944 births
Living people
Sierra Leonean Muslims
Foreign Ministers of Sierra Leone
Education ministers
Government ministers of Sierra Leone
Temne people
Alumni of Durham University
Alumni of the University of Southampton